Endoxyla magnifica is a moth in the family Cossidae. It is found in Australia and New Zealand.

References

Endoxyla (moth)
Moths described in 1896